Hypocrita meres is a moth of the family Erebidae. It was described by Herbert Druce in 1911. It is found in Colombia.

References

 

Hypocrita
Moths described in 1911